Meleonoma facialis is a moth in the family Cosmopterigidae. It is found in China (Shaanxi).

References

Natural History Museum Lepidoptera generic names catalog

Cosmopterigidae